The Marches of Entre-Sambre-et-Meuse are a set of folk marches, taking place from May to October, in Belgium in Entre-Sambre-et-Meuse. Ancient religious processions dedicated to local saints, protectors of parishes have taken over time a folkloric character, without the religious aspect getting totally lost. They are accompanied by armed escorts, which are just as well traditional.

In 2012, fifteen of these marches were recognised as masterpieces of the Oral and Intangible Heritage by UNESCO.

History 
These religious processions have their origin in the Corpus Christi processions. They were most often then dedicated to a saint who miraculously interceded in favor of the local community. Many steps are thus placed under the patronage of Saint Roch (Thuin, Ham-sur-Heure, Châtelet, Acoz ...) who would have interceded on behalf of the populations during the plague epidemics of the 17th century.

The origin of the armed escorts accompanying these processions is essentially secular. These armed escorts are the heirs of the urban and rural militias which were to protect towns and villages. These militias also honored major protests in their localities. Over time, these militias have disappeared and their role has shifted to more popular societies, the "jeunesses". These societies of unmarried men were most often responsible for the organization of festive events in towns and villages. These groups perpetuated the traditions by preserving a military aspect to the escorts and by equipping them as best they could with uniforms (of the First and Second Empire and the Belgian Garde Civique) and firearms. Since the 1960s, there have been more groups dressed in uniforms inspired by or identical to those of the armies of the First Empire.

Procession order 
Although subject to different variants, the order of these processions obeys a few rules common to the different markets:

- The procession is almost always opened by a platoon of men wearing sapper uniforms. Recognizable by wearing a white apron (in canvas or leather), they carry an ax.

- Next is the battery. This musical phalanx is composed of fifres and drums performing traditional tunes. Led by a drum major, the drums are sometimes followed by a music company, fanfare or harmony.

Then the majors on horseback follow. These officers are mounted and their number may vary. They are the ones who will generally command the bursts.

The flag and its escort, most often made up of young children wearing officers' uniforms, are placed between the majors and the firing squads.

The latter can be dressed in costumes of outfielders, grenadiers, zouaves, etc. When there are blunderbusses, these usually close ranks. The main role of the shooters is to make the powder speak during the discharges (bursts) in honor of the saint or of the personalities receiving the procession.

The clergy then come, accompanying the relics and followed by the pilgrims.

In some villages, a platoon of riders can also be added to the company. When this is the case, he often opens the way by placing himself in front of the company.

Glass breaking 
The breaking of the glass is a traditional ceremony during which, in certain villages of the Marcheurs, the places of officers are allocated. The priority criteria vary from one Company to another depending on local traditions. Numerous office forces are constituted according to degrees of seniority within the Company. Other committees auction off the places of officers and thus favor the highest bidders.

Whatever the form, the breaking of the glass constitutes, in all cases, a swearing in, a personal commitment of each officer vis-à-vis folklore, the heritage of his land, a promise to strive to maintain traditions in their true value.

In the presence of many Marcheurs, the mayor and the aldermen, each officer raises his glass, of beer or of "goutte", called a "misérable" at this occasion (because it lacks a foot), empties it at once and throws it violently at his feet. At the moment that the glass breaks, the applause of the spectators and the rolling of the drums salute his engagement.

This "passage of places" is considered very official. The officer must organize, manage, recruit and ensure the maintenance of dignity.

Statutes of 1894 mention the following article: "Whoever after breaking the glass would evade the contracted engagement would be regarded as perjury. We would despise him, he would lose all confidence!".

Intangible Cultural Heritage 
The fifteen marches included on the Lists of Intangible Cultural Heritage take place in the following localities:
 
 Acoz (Gerpinnes): Saint-Roch and Saint-Frégo march
 Biesmerée (Mettet): Saint-Pierre march
 Florennes: Saints-Pierre-et-Paul march
 Fosses-la-Ville: Saint-Feuillen march, septennial march, last march in 2019
 Gerpinnes: Marche Sainte-Rolende
 Ham-sur-Heure (Ham-sur-Heure-Nalinnes): Marche Saint-Roch
 Jumet (Charleroi): Tour de la Madeleine
 Laneffe (Walcourt): Saint-Éloi march
 Morialmé (Florennes): Saint-Pierre march
 Silenrieux (Cerfontaine): Sainte-Anne march
 Tarcienne (Walcourt): Saint-Fiacre march, the first Sunday in May
 Thuin: Saint-Roch march
 Thy-le-Château (Walcourt): Saints-Pierre-et-Paul march
 Villers-Deux-Églises (Cerfontaine): Saint-Pierre march
 Walcourt: March of the Trinity

See also 
 Ommegang

References

Bibliography

External links 
 Association des Marches Folkloriques de l'Entre-Sambre-et-Meuse, site also showing the calendar of the marches 
 Museum of the folklorical marches of Entre-Sambre-et-Meuse 

Masterpieces of the Oral and Intangible Heritage of Humanity
Belgian culture
Belgian folklore